Nellore South railway station (station code:NLS), located in the Indian state of Andhra Pradesh, serves Nellore in Nellore district.

History 
The Vijayawada–Chennai link was established in 1899.

The Chirala–Elavur section was electrified in 1980–81.

Classification 
In terms of earnings and outward passengers handled, Nellore South is categorized as a Halt Grade-1 (HG-1) railway station. Based on the re–categorization of Indian Railway stations for the period of 2017–18 and 2022–23, an HG–1 category station earns nearly  lakh and handles close to  passengers.

References 

Transport in Nellore
Railway stations in Nellore district
Vijayawada railway division
Railway stations in India opened in 1899